Farren is both a surname and a given name. Notable people with the name include:

Surname
 Charlie Farren (born 1953), American musician
 Daniel Farren (1848–?), Irish-born soldier in the U.S. Army
 Elizabeth Farren (c. 1759 – 1829), English actress
 Fred Farren, English footballer
 George Farren (1874–1956), English cricketer
 Henry Farren (1826?–1860), English actor who settled in America, and theatre manager
 J. Michael Farren (born 1953), American attorney and public servant in two U.S. presidential administrations
 Mark Farren (1982-2016), Irish footballer
 Mick Farren (1943–2013), English journalist, author and singer
 Nellie Farren (1848–1904), English actress
 Paul Farren (born 1960), American NFL professional football player 1983–1991
 Robert Farren (1909–1985), Irish poet
 Sean Farren (born 1939), member and minister in the Northern Ireland Legislative Assembly
 William Farren (1786–1861), English actor
 William Farren Jr. (1825–1908), English actor, son of William Farren

Given name
 Farren Blackburn, British film and television director and scriptwriter
 Farren Ray (born 1986), Australian rules footballer